Körnbach is a river of Thuringia, Germany. It flows into the Zahme Gera in Geraberg.

See also
List of rivers of Thuringia

References

Rivers of Thuringia
Rivers of Germany